Nicholas Mohtadi is a Canadian orthopaedic surgeon and former professional tennis player.

Mohtadi was born in England and is of Iranian descent. His father, Matthew Farhang Mohtadi, was an Iranian-Canadian academic and Olympic basketball player. The family settled in Calgary, Alberta in 1967.

A national junior champion, Mohtadi went to Oklahoma City University on a tennis scholarship and finished his education back in Canada at the University of Calgary, graduating in 1981 with a Doctor of Medicine.

Mohtadi competed briefly in professional tennis and qualified for the men's doubles main draw at Wimbledon in 1982.

References

External links
 
 

Year of birth missing (living people)
Living people
Canadian male tennis players
Oklahoma City Stars men's tennis players
University of Calgary alumni
Canadian people of Iranian descent
English emigrants to Canada
Sportspeople from Birmingham, West Midlands
Canadian orthopedic surgeons
Sportspeople from Calgary
Medalists at the 1979 Summer Universiade
Universiade bronze medalists for Canada
Universiade medalists in tennis